David Howland Chipman (born 1966) is an American former ATF agent and gun control advocate who was most recently the nominee to serve as the director of the Bureau of Alcohol, Tobacco, Firearms and Explosives in the Biden administration; however, this nomination was withdrawn.

Early life and education 
Chipman was born in Hanover, New Hampshire and raised in Oakland County, Michigan. After graduating from Phillips Exeter Academy, he earned a Bachelor of Science degree in justice from American University and a Master of Science in management from Johns Hopkins University.

Career 
Chipman spent 25 years as a special agent in the Bureau of Alcohol, Tobacco, Firearms, monitoring firearm trafficking from Virginia to New York City. After leaving the ATF, Chipman became a senior policy advisor at Giffords. In late-2013, he joined ShotSpotter as the senior vice president of U.S. public safety solutions. Chipman was nominated as director of the ATF in April 2021, following an announcement from President Joe Biden. On April 12, 2021, his nomination was sent to the Senate. On May 26, 2021, a hearing on his nomination was held before the Senate Judiciary Committee. The committee deadlocked on his nomination in a party-line vote on June 24, 2021. On September 9, 2021, the White House announced that it would withdraw Chipman’s nomination due to bipartisan backlash over his stances on gun control.

References

1966 births
Living people
People from Hanover, New Hampshire
People from Oakland County, Michigan
Phillips Exeter Academy alumni
American University alumni
ATF agents
Johns Hopkins University alumni
American gun control activists